Borabenzene is a hypothetical organoboron compound with the formula C5H5B. Unlike the related but highly stable benzene molecule, borabenzene would be electron-deficient.  Related derivatives are the boratabenzene anions, including the parent [C5H5BH]−.

Adducts
Adducts of borabenzene with Lewis bases are isolatable. Since borabenzene is unavailable, these adducts require indirect methods. 4-Silyl-1-methoxyboracyclohexadiene is used as a precursor to the borabenzene:

 +  →  + MeOSiMe3

The pyridine adduct  is structurally related to biphenyl. It is a yellow whereas biphenyl is colorless, indicating distinct electronic structures. The pyridine ligand is tightly bound: no exchange is observed with free pyridine, even at elevated temperatures.

The borabenzene-pyridine adduct behaves like a diene, not an analog of biphenyl, and will undergo Diels-Alder reactions.

See also 
 6-membered aromatic rings with one carbon replaced by another group: silabenzene, germabenzene, stannabenzene, pyridine, phosphorine, arsabenzene, stibabenzene, bismabenzene, pyrylium, thiopyrylium, selenopyrylium, telluropyrylium
 Borazine

References

Boron heterocycles
Six-membered rings
Hypothetical chemical compounds